Cyril Percival (1889–1948) was a British film actor of the silent era.

Selected filmography
 Love in a Wood (1915)
 The Princess of Happy Chance (1917)
 London Pride (1920)
 The Town of Crooked Ways (1920)
 The Duchess of Seven Dials (1920)
 The Sport of Kings (1921)
 The Broken Road (1921)
 The Knave of Diamonds (1921)
 The Woman with the Fan (1921)
 The Magistrate (1921)
 The Yellow Claw (1921)
 The Missioner (1922)
 Wee MacGregor's Sweetheart (1922)

References

Bibliography
 Goble, Alan. The Complete Index to Literary Sources in Film. Walter de Gruyter, 1999.

External links

1889 births
1948 deaths
British male film actors